Arkadiusz Piech (born 7 June 1985) is a Polish professional footballer who plays as a forward for Górnik Polkowice.

Club career

Ruch Chorzów
Piech made his Ekstraklasa debut on 27 February 2010.

Sivasspor
Arkadiusz Piech has been the transfer of Sivasspor in January 2013.

Legia Warsaw
On 18 June 2014, Piech joined Legia Warsaw on a three-year deal.

Śląsk Wrocław
On 23 June 2017, he signed a contract with Śląsk Wrocław.

International career
Piech made his debut for Poland on 16 December 2011, in a match against Bosnia and Hercegovina.

He was chosen as the Ekstraklasa player of the year, of season 2011-12. Even with this achievement he was not called up to his national side for the upcoming UEFA Euro 2012.

However, after Waldemar Fornalik took over as the national team coach, Piech started to get called up regularly, and was the second choice striker behind Robert Lewandowski.

References

External links
 
 

1985 births
Living people
People from Świdnica
Sportspeople from Lower Silesian Voivodeship
Association football forwards
Polish footballers
Widzew Łódź players
Ruch Chorzów players
Sivasspor footballers
Zagłębie Lubin players
Legia Warsaw players
GKS Bełchatów players
AEL Limassol players
Apollon Limassol FC players
Śląsk Wrocław players
Odra Opole players
Górnik Polkowice players
Ekstraklasa players
I liga players
Süper Lig players
Cypriot First Division players
Polish expatriate footballers
Expatriate footballers in Turkey
Expatriate footballers in Cyprus
Polish expatriate sportspeople in Turkey
Polish expatriate sportspeople in Cyprus
Poland international footballers